"Kumba Yo!" is a 2001 collaborative single by Guano Apes (credited as Guano Babes) featuring German comedian Michael Mittermeier. This song is notable for being the only Apes song to use profanity, with only one use of the word "fucking" in the song and serves as their highest-charting single in their native Germany. The song uses elements of the song "Kumbaya". The video shows the band capturing and tying Mittermeier to their car.

Track listing

CD single
Kumba Yo! - 3:22
Kumba Yo! (Acoustic Version) - 3:16
Kumba Yo! (Easy Buzz Remix) - 2:55
Kumba Yo! (Karaoke Version) + Hidden Kumba - 4:56

Charts

Weekly charts

Year-end charts

References

2001 singles
Guano Apes songs
2001 songs